Barbara Aleksandrówna (c. 1428  between 1488 and 1492) was a princess and wife of prince Bolesław IV of Warsaw. She was the daughter of Alexander Włodzimierzowic, Grand Prince of Kiev.

Between 1440 and 1443 she married Bolesław IV of Warsaw. Her husband died on September 10, 1454. After death of her mother-in-law in 1458 she became a regent in the name of her minor sons Konrad III, Bolesław V, Kazimierz III, and Janusz II. She usually entitled herself ducissa et gubernatrix Mazouie etc.

She was buried in Nowe Miasto, Płońsk County.

Footnotes

References 
Balzer Oswald, Genealogia Piastów, Akademia Umiejętności, Kraków 1895, p. 523.
Grabowski Janusz, Dynastia Piastów mazowieckich, Kraków 2012.
Jasiński Kazimierz, Rodowód Piastów mazowieckich, Wydawnictwo Historyczne, Poznań – Wrocław 1998, ISSN 1509-8702, pp. 159–160.

Further reading 
Wolff Adam, Barbara ks. ruska nieznanego pochodzenia, Polski słownik biograficzny, Vol. 1, 1935.

Gediminids
History of Masovia
15th-century Lithuanian women
15th-century deaths